Mary Ann Newman is the director of the Farragut Fund for Catalan Culture in the US. She is a translator, editor, and occasional writer on Catalan culture. She has translated a novel and a short story collection by Quim Monzó, essays by Xavier Rubert de Ventós, and a collection of poems by Josep Carner. 

She graduated from New York University's Washington Square College in 1976 with a Bachelor of Arts degree. In 1985, she graduated with a doctorate from New York University. As of 2019, her latest translation is Private Life by Josep Maria de Sagarra, published by Archipelago Books. 

She was awarded the Creu de Sant Jordi, and with the Ramon Llull International award (2022)

References 

Linguists from the United States
Women linguists
Writers from New York City
Living people
American translators
American women writers
Year of birth missing (living people)